Viļaka (Vilyaka; Yiddish: ויליאקי, Vilyaki) is a town in Balvi Municipality in the Latgale region of Latvia. The population in 2020 was 1,223. Viļaka is located 246 km from Riga, and 8 km from border with Russia.

See also
List of cities in Latvia
Viļaka Castle

References 

Towns in Latvia
1945 establishments in Latvia
Balvi Municipality
Lyutsinsky Uyezd
Latgale